Spera is a frazione of the comune of Castel Ivano in northern Italy.

Spera may also refer to:

Places
Spera, Khost Province, Afghanistan
Spera District

People with the surname
Benedetto Spera (born 1934), Sicilian mafioso
Danielle Spera (born 1957), Austrian journalist
Deborah Spera, American television producer
Gabriel Spera, American poet